The 2016 Big Sky Conference men's basketball tournament was held March 7–12 at the Reno Events Center in Reno, Nevada. This was the first Big Sky tournament at a neutral site and the first to include all twelve conference members. The top two seeds met in the final; regular season champion Weber State defeated Montana  and advanced to the NCAA tournament.

Seeds
All 12 Big Sky schools participated in the tournament. Teams were seeded by conference season record, with the top four teams receiving a first round bye. A tiebreaker system was used to seed teams with identical conference records.

Schedule

Bracket

* – denotes overtime period

NCAA tournament
The Wildcats received the automatic bid to the NCAA tournament; no other Big Sky members were invited to the tournament or  Weber State was seeded fifteenth in the East regional and lost  to Xavier in the first round  It was the tenth consecutive year that the Big Sky representative lost in the first round.

References

External links

Tournament
Big Sky Conference men's basketball tournament
Big Sky Conference men's basketball tournament
Big Sky Conference men's basketball tournament
Basketball competitions in Reno, Nevada
College sports tournaments in Nevada